Villa Guardia is a comune (municipality) in the Province of Como in the Italian region Lombardy, located about  northwest of Milan and about  southwest of Como.

Villa Guardia borders the following municipalities: Bulgarograsso, Cassina Rizzardi, Colverde, Grandate, Luisago, Lurate Caccivio, Montano Lucino.

References

External links
 Official website

Cities and towns in Lombardy